Szabolcs may refer to:
Szabolcs-Szatmár-Bereg, current administrative unit (county) of Hungary
Szabolcs (village) in Hungary's Szabolcs-Szatmár-Bereg county
Szabolcs (county), the historical administrative unit of the Kingdom of Hungary
Szabolcs (given name), links to people called Szabolcs
Szabolcs (name), about the Hungarian given name Szabolcs

See also
Economy of Szabolcs-Szatmár-Bereg
Geography of Szabolcs-Szatmár-Bereg
History of Szabolcs-Szatmár-Bereg
Index of Szabolcs-Szatmár-Bereg-related articles